Dethiobacter is a bacterial genus from the family of Syntrophomonadaceae with one known species (Dethiobacter alkaliphilus).

References

Eubacteriales
Bacteria genera
Monotypic bacteria genera